Civitaquana is a comune and town in the Province of Pescara in the Abruzzo region of Italy

History
In 883, the town is mentioned in the Chronicon Casauriense as part of the diocesis of Pelle. In 1269, Civitaquana was granted as a fiefdom by King Charles of Anjou to poet Sordello da Goito, but he probably died immediately afterwards since the king gave Civitaquana to Bonifacio di Galiberto. In 1458, king Ferrante d'Aragona granted the lordship to Laudadio De Lagmyniano, "Giustiziere" of Abruzzo, whose palace can still be seen in the main square.

References

Cities and towns in Abruzzo